The Münchner Sommernachtstraum (Munich Midsummer Nights Dream) is a show event that has been held annually in July since 2004 in Olympiapark.

Description 
The Münchner Sommernachtstraum consists of live concerts and a 35-minute musical fireworks display. So far, bands like the Spider Murphy Gang, Münchener Freiheit, Scooter, Rainhard Fendrich, Haindling, Nena, Heino, DJ Antoine, Milk & Sugar, Billy Idol, Rea Garvey or Cro.

In 2006, the Münchner Sommernachtstraum had received 60,000 visitors. In 2008, the year of the 850th Munich City Birthday, the Munich Midsummer Nights Dream set a new visitor record with 63,000 visitors.

In 2017, the event was more compact in order to avoid long walking distances for visitors. Once again, a two-stage concept was implemented with a main stage on Coubertinplatz and an "Inselbeat stage" on the eastern shore of the Olympic lake.

The event was attended by 25,000 people.

In 2019 the Münchner Sommernachtstraum was the largest firework display in Germany to date, with approximately 11,000 individual ignitions and 4 tons of pyrotechnics.

References

External links 
 Official website
 Fireworks at the Münchner Sommernachtstraum 2017

Fireworks events in Europe
Events in Munich
Tourist attractions in Munich
Culture in Munich
2004 establishments in Germany